is a Japanese footballer who plays as a centre back for Júbilo Iwata.

Career statistics

References

External links

2001 births
Living people
Japanese footballers
Japan youth international footballers
Association football defenders
Júbilo Iwata players
J2 League players